Tonya Pinkins (born May 30, 1962) is an American actress and filmmaker. Her award-winning debut feature film RED PILL was an official selection at the 2021 Pan African Film Festival, won the Best Black Lives Matter Feature and Best First Feature at The Mykonos International Film Festival, Best First Feature at the Luléa Film Festival, and is nominated for awards in numerous festivals around the globe. Her web-series The RED PILLING of AMERICA can be heard on her podcast "You Can't Say That!" at BPN.fm/ycst

She is known for her portrayal of Livia Frye on the soap opera All My Children and for her roles on Broadway. She has been nominated for three Tony Awards (winning one), and has won Obie, Lortel, Drama Desk, Outer Critics Circle, AUDLECO, Garland, L.A. Drama Critics Circle, Clarence Derwent, and NAACP Theater Awards. She has been nominated for the Olivier, Helen Hayes, Noel, Joseph Jefferson, NAACP Image, Soap Opera Digest, and Ovation Awards. She won the Tony Award for Best Featured Actress in a Musical for Jelly's Last Jam.

Early life and education 
Pinkins was born in Chicago, Illinois. Her father was a police officer and insurance salesman, and her mother is a former postal worker. She has two brothers, Eric and Thomas Swoope, and a sister Tamera Swoope.

Pinkins was interested in the arts from a young age. At Whitney Young Magnet High School, she participated in the theater program and also studied acting at the Goodman Theatre Young People's Program. She attended Carnegie Mellon University's BFA Musical Theatre program, but was cast in Merrily We Roll Along and decided to pursue her career, instead.

Pinkins later returned to college, earning an undergraduate degree in creative writing from Columbia College Chicago in 1996, followed by a year at California Western School of Law in San Diego.

Career 
Pinkins won a Tony Award for her performance as Sweet Anita in Jelly's Last Jam. She was nominated for her roles in Play On! and in Caroline, or Change, where she played the title role. Her additional Broadway credits include Merrily We Roll Along, Chronicle of a Death Foretold, The Wild Party, House of Flowers, Radio Golf, A Time To Kill, and Holler If Ya Hear Me.

Pinkins has performed in several off-Broadway productions, including the comic role of Mopsa, the Shepherdess, in The Winter's Tale produced by the Riverside Shakespeare Company at The Shakespeare Center in 1983.

In 2011, Pinkins starred in the world premiere of Kirsten Greenidge's Milk Like Sugar at La Jolla Playhouse, and received a 2012 Craig Noel nomination for Best featured Actress in a Play. She reprised her role in the Playwrights Horizons in the Peter Jay Sharp Theater, and garnered a 2012 Lucille Lortel Award for Outstanding Featured Actress in a Play.

In 2012, Pinkins starred in Katori Hall's play Hurt Village, the gritty drama about life and change in a Memphis housing project made its world-premiere at Off-Broadway's Signature Theatre Company as part of the theatre's inaugural season.

In 2014, she appeared in New Federal Theatre's revival of Ed Bullins' The Fabulous Miss Marie opposite Roscoe Orman; in the Broadway production of Holler If Ya Hear Me; and the world premiere of Branden Jacobs-Jenkins' War at Yale Repertory. She also made guest appearances on such television shows as Army Wives, 24, Law & Order, The Cosby Show, Cold Case, Criminal Minds, and The Guardian among others.

During the mid-1980s Pinkins created the character of "Heather Dalton" on the CBS soap As the World Turns. In 1991, she was cast as Livia Frye in All My Children. Pinkins left All My Children in 1995 but returned to her role in 2003. She was later put on contract with the show from March 2004 until June 2006, when she was downgraded to recurring status.

She played Amala Motobo on 24.  Pinkins played Ethel Peabody on the television show Gotham. In 2016, she played Mimi Corcoran on the Hulu science fiction limited series 11.22.63, based on the Stephen King book of the same name, and starring James Franco and Sarah Gadon. On March 16, 2017, she portrayed Sandra in the ABC television series Scandal.

Pinkins has appeared in several films in supporting roles, including Newlyweeds, Home, Fading Gigolo opposite Woody Allen, Enchanted, Premium, Romance & Cigarettes, Noah's Arc: Jumping The Broom and Above the Rim among others.

Pinkins has performed in several cabaret shows including Bring On The Men with Brad Simmons, Tonya Pinkins UnPlugged at The National Black Theater Festival and Hurricane Ethel.

Pinkins wrote, directed, and starred as Cassandra in Red Pill, to be released in 2020.

Filmography

Film

Television

References

External links 
 
 

 Official website

1962 births
American soap opera actresses
American stage actresses
American television actresses
Living people
African-American actresses
Tony Award winners
Actresses from Chicago
Whitney M. Young Magnet High School alumni
20th-century American actresses
21st-century American actresses
American film actresses
Columbia College Chicago alumni
20th-century African-American women
20th-century African-American people
21st-century African-American women
21st-century African-American people